Run for Love may refer to:

Run for Love (film) (Chinese: Bēn Ài), a 2016 Chinese film
"Run for Love!", a comic by Tony Abruzzo which was the base of Roy Lichtenstein's painting Hopeless
Run For Love, a road race Armonk, New York
"Run for Love", a 1984 song by Winder
"Run for Love", a 2007 song by Charlie Dée
"Run for Love", a 2011 song by Joan as Police Woman from The Deep Field